Vis and Rāmin (Vis o Rāmin) is a classical Persian love story. The epic was composed in poetry by Fakhruddin As'ad Gurgani (or "Gorgani") in the 11th century. Gorgani claimed a Sassanid origin for the story, but it is now regarded as of Parthian dynastic origin, probably from the 1st century AD. It has also been suggested that Gorgani's story reflects the traditions and customs of the period immediately before he himself lived. That cannot be ruled out, as stories retold from ancient sources often include elements drawn from the time of their narrator.

Framework
The framework of the story is the opposition of two Parthian ruling houses, one in the west and the other in the east. Gorgani originally belongs to Hyrcania which is one of main lands of Parthians. The existence of these small kingdoms and the feudalistic background point to a date in the Parthian period of Iranian history. The popularity of this pre-Islamic story in the Islamic period is mentioned by the poet himself, and shows that there was a demand for ancient themes and traditional lore.

Synopsis 

The story is about Vis, the daughter of Shāhrū and Kāren, the ruling family of Māh (Media) in western Iran, and Ramin (Rāmīn), the brother to Mobed Manikan, the King of Marv in northeastern Iran. Manikan sees Shāhrū in a royal gala, wonders at her beauty, and asks her to marry him. She answers that she is already married, but she promises to give him her daughter if a girl is born to her.

Shāhrū gives birth to a girl and calls her Vis (or Viseh). She sends the infant to Khuzan to be raised by a wet-nurse who also happens to be raising Ramin, who is the same age as Vis. They grow up together. When Vis reaches adolescence, she returns to her mother, who marries Vis to her brother Viru. The marriage remains unconsummated because of Vis' menstruation, which by Zoroastrian law makes her unapproachable. Mobad Manikan finds out about the marriage celebration and sends his brother Zard to remind Shāhrū of her promise to give him Vis as his wife. Vis rejects Manikan's request and refuses to go. An aggrieved Manikan leads an army against Māh-abad. Vis's father, Qārin, is killed in the ensuing conflict, but Manikan also suffers a defeat from Viru. Manikan then takes his army to Gurab, where Vis is waiting the outcome of the battle. He sends a messenger to her, offering her various privileges in return for marrying him. Vis rejects Manikan's offer proudly and indignantly. Manikan asks advice from his two brothers Zard and Ramin. Ramin, who is already in love with Vis, attempts to dissuade Manikan from trying to marry her. However, Manikan's brother Zard suggests bribing Shāhrū as a way of winning over Vis. Manikan sends money and jewels to Shāhrū and bribes her to gain entry to the castle. He then takes Vis away, much to the chagrin of Viru.

On the journey back to Marv, Ramin catches a glimpse of Vis and is consumed with love for her, so much so that he falls off his horse and faints. Vis is given residence in the harem of Manikan and gifts are bestowed upon her. Vis's nurse also follows her to Marv, and attempts to persuade her to behave pragmatically, accept Manikan and forget Viru. Vis at first has a hard time accepting her fate, but eventually resigns herself to life in the harem.

Still mourning her father's death and her kidnapping, Vis refuses to give herself to Manikan for a year. Her nurse makes a talisman that renders Manikan impotent for one month. The spell can be broken only if the talisman is broken, and it is swept away in a flood and lost, so that Manikan is never able to sleep with his bride. Meanwhile, after many attempts to contact Vis, Ramin finally meets with her and the two consummate their love while Manikan is away at war.

When Manikan returns, he overhears a conversation between the nurse and Vis, and realizes his wife loves Ramin. Manikan demands that Vis prove her chastity by undergoing trial by fire. But Vis and Ramin elope. Manikan's mother makes peace between Ramin and the king, and they all go back to Marv.

Manikan takes Ramin along on a campaign against the Romans, but Ramin falls sick and is left behind. Ramin goes back to Vis, who is imprisoned in a castle by Manikan and guarded by the king's other brother Zard. Ramin scales the wall and spends his time with Vis until Manikan comes back from the war and Ramin escapes.

Ramin thinks that his love with Vis has no future, so he asks Manikan to send him to Maah on a mission. There, Ramin falls in love with a woman called Gol and marries her. Vis finds about this and sends her nurse to Ramin to remind him of their love. Ramin sends back a harsh reply. Vis sends an elaborate message pleading with him to come back. At this time, Ramin was bored from his married life and after he receives the second message he goes back to Vis. But when he reaches Marv on his horseback in a snow storm, Vis goes to the roof of the castle and rejects his love. Ramin goes off desperately. Vis regrets what she has done and sends the nurse after Ramin. They reconcile.

Manikan takes Ramin hunting while Vis and the nurse with some other women attend a fire temple nearby. Ramin leaves the hunt, disguises himself as a woman to enter the temple, and flees with Vis. They go back to the castle and, with help from Ramin's men, kill the garrison and Zard as well. They then escaped to Dailam, on the coast of the Caspian Sea. Manikan is killed by a boar during the hunt. Vis and Ramin come back to Marv and Ramin sits on the throne as the king and marries Vis. Ramin reigns for 83 years. In the 81st year Vis dies and Ramin hands over the kingdom to his eldest son with Vis and goes and mourn on Vis' tomb for 2 years, after which he joins her in the afterlife.

Influence 

The Vis and Ramin story had a noticeable influence on Persian literature. Significantly, Nizami, himself a major poet of Persian romantic traditions, took the bases of much of his rhetoric from Gorgani.

The romance also has had its influence beyond Persian culture. The story became very popular also in Georgia through a 12th-century free translation in prose known as Visramiani, which had a longlasting effect on the Georgian literature. Being the oldest known manuscript of the work and better preserved than the original, it is of great importance for the history of the Persian text and helps restore several corrupted lines in the Persian manuscripts.

The great scholar Vladimir Minorsky did a four-part study of the story and was convinced of its Parthian origin.

Some scholars have suggested that Vis and Ramin may have influenced the Tristan and Iseult legend, and the two plots have distinct resemblances. Nevertheless, views have differed about the connection between these two stories.

Excerpt 

An excerpt where the beauty of Vis is described:

Metre
Gorgani's poem is composed in the hazaj meter, one of the seven Persian metres traditionally used for writing long poems. The 11-syllable line has this structure:

 u – – – | u – – – | u – –
 
 u = short syllable; – = long syllable

The first couplet of the extract quoted above reads as follows:
  u  – –   –   u –  –   –   u  – –
 
  u  –  –   –   u  –  –  –   u  – –
 

The same metre is used in Nezami's romantic epic Khusrow o Shirin, completed in 1192.

Notes

See also 
 Shahnameh (Iran's national epic book)
 Firdowsi (Writer of Shahnameh)
 Persian literature
 Persian mythology

References

 Julie Scott Meisami, Medieval Persian Court Poetry, Princeton, 1987.
 Vladimir Minorsky, "Vis u Ramin: A Parthian Romance," Bulletin of the School of Oriental and African Studies, vol. XI, 1943–46, pp. 741–63; Vol. XII, 1947–1948, pp. 20–35; Vol. XVI, 1954, pp. 91–92; "New Developments". Vol. XXV, 1962, pp. 275–86. Read online

English translations

External links
 Vīs u Rāmīn, The Persian Epic on The Love of Vīs and Rāmīn, by Fakhr al-dīn Gorgānī, Persian Critical Text composed from the Persian and Georgian oldest manuscripts by Magali A. Todua and Alexander A. Gwakharia, edited by Kamal S. Aini (Tehran 1970). Digitized text: University of Frankfurt am Main, Germany.
 Vīs u Rāmīn, audiobook, recorded by Ahmad Karimi Hakkak at University of Washington, USA.
 Dick Davis (January 6, 2005), "Vis o Rāmin", in: Encyclopaedia Iranica Online Edition. Accessed on April 4, 2010.

Love stories
Persian mythology
Persian poems
Epic poems in Persian
11th-century poems